José María Moreno Carrascal (born 6 October 1951) is a Spanish poet, translator, and teacher.

Biography and career

Early years
José María Moreno Carrascal was born in 1951 in Ayerbe (Aragón), [Spain] of Estramaduran parents. After living for three years in Cangas de Onís [Asturias], in 1956 his family relocated to Sanlúcar la Mayor [Andalucia, a region where his parents had lived for two decades]. He attended the local Catholic elementary schools in these two towns. In 1961 his family moved to Seville.

Education
During the 1960s he completed his secondary school education in the Instituto "San Isidoro"  (I.E.S. San Isidoro), Sevilla. In the summer of 1967, he toured  Morocco with a group of fellow students. The following year he lived and studied in East Aurora, New York, after being granted a scholarship by the international youth organization American Field Service. In 1970 he began his undergraduate studies at the Facultad de Filosofía y Letras in the University of Seville and started the first of a two-year study at the Seville Conservatory of Music and Drama (Conservatorio y Escuela de Arte Dramático). In 1972 he transferred to the University of Granada where he completed his degree in English Philology (Licenciado en Filología Inglesa).

Career
After living in New Orleans (USA) for two years, he returned to the Spanish Andalusian towns of Arcos de la Frontera (where, for a period of three years, he worked at the local public secondary school as a Spanish Literature and English teacher) and Rota (where he worked as an English teacher until October 2011). He also had a chance, during the last years of his active career as an educator in Spain, to teach and coordinate adult education language hybrid classes. He began to publish his literary translations and poems during the second half of the nineteen seventies and early eighties. In the academic year 1982-1983 he lived in London, England, teaching Spanish at The Prince Regent Comprehensive School. Back in Spain, during the school years 1984-1986, he took postgraduate courses in Spanish and English Literature and Literary Criticism at the University of Cádiz and, years later (1997–1999), at UNED (Universidad Nacional de Educación a Distancia), Madrid, where, in 2010, he defended his Doctoral Thesis  entitled Self and Modernism: A study of the Poetry of D. H. Lawrence, which obtained the qualification of summa cum laude and was awarded Premio Extraordinario de Doctorado. Moving back to the USA, he became an adjunct professor during the school year 2012-2013 in the Department of Romance Languages and the Augustine and Culture Seminar at Villanova University (Pennsylvania). In 2015 he, along with his wife and young son, moved south, to the state of Florida, where he is currently teaching English Composition and North-American and World Literature as an instructor for Southern State University, at CCA (Calvary Christian Academy), Ormond Beach, and Spanish language in the Department of World Languages and Cultures at Stetson University, DeLand. He has also worked as an on- call language instructor for L-3 Communications in San Antonio, Texas, and Miami, Florida. In 2017 he obtained a full time position as Associate Professor of English Literature and Spanish in the department of English and World Languages in the Black Historical University of Bethune-Cookman,Daytona Beach, Fl.

He has travelled extensively through Europe, Morocco, North America and Central America.

His translations and studies of mostly English and American poets have been published in book form by different Spanish publishers (Renacimiento, Edinexus, Visor, Pre-Textos) as well as in literary and academic periodicals and magazines (Estafeta Literaria, Fin de Siglo, Clarín, Condados de Niebla, Revista Atlántica de Poesía, Demófilo,Isla de Siltolá, Atlantis, etc.), some of which have also included his own poetical works. In the year 2010 his book of poems Los Jardines de Hielo received an accesit in the  International Poetry Award  given by the Ecoem Foundation in Seville, Spain, and in 2012 his collection of poems   Los Reinos Diminutos  won the 27th Unicaja International Poetry Award. His last poetry collection in Spanish,   Océano en medio , was published in 2018 in Seville, Spain.

Bibliography and awards

Book translations
 (1998) Poems (D.H. Lawrence)
 (1999) Poems (John Updike)
 (1999) Serranía de Roda (Felipe Benítez Reyes). English text.
 (2001) The Roominghouse Madrigals: Early Selected Poems (Charles Bukowski)
(2015) En un tranvía español y otros poemas (D.H. Lawrence)
(2020)"Laughable Critters and Spooks", English version of "Poemas Terrorísticos.Poemas para niños (María Antonia Carrascal) 
Poetry collections and awards 
 (2010) Los Jardines de Hielo. Accesit in the International Poetry Award by Ecoem  Foundation.
   (2012) Los Reinos Diminutos. 27th Unicaja International Poetry Award.

 (2018) Océano en medio, Editorial Renacimiento, Sevilla

'''Articles, poetry translations, and reviews

 + José María M. Carrascal, “Space as a narrative constant in three Andalusian novels”, English version of “El espacio, una constante en la narrativa en tres novelas andaluzas” by Jose Juan  Yborra Aznar, en Cauce, Revista Internacional de Filología V. 44, 2021 pp.147 168  https://issuu.com/librosdelaherida/docs/narrativa_andaluza_jos_juan_yborra_versi_n_en_ing

+ Jose Maria Moreno Carrascal, Review of Eras la Noche by Ramón Pérez Montero,https://librosdelaherida.blogspot.com/2021/04/resena-de-eras-la-noche-writer-as.html

+ José María M. Carrascal, Jean Toomer “Sentado en mi habitación y otros poemas” (pp. 46- 52).  Versión y nota Clarin. Revista de Literatura (subsidized by the Spanish Ministry of Education) Año XXVII • Nº 155 • Julio-Agosto de 2021 • ISSN: 1136-1182.
 
+José M. Moreno Carrascal “Eva Angelical” Jean Toomer.  Traducción y nota de (pp25-26) Anáfora. Creación y Crítica, Julio 2021, ISSN 2444-9504.

+ José María Moreno Carrascal (Introduction and translation) Alda Merini:"Poesía, dolor y fama", Clarín, Revista de Nueva Literatura, November-
December, 2014, nº,114, pp. 14–20, Oviedo, Spain.

+ José María Moreno Carrascal,  Review in English of "El Despertar" Kate Chopin, edited and translated by Eulalia Gil Piñero Cátedra, Madrid, 2012,  
ATLANTIS. Journal of the Spanish Association of Anglo-American Studies, 36.1 (June 2014):pp. 185–189.                   

 José María Moreno Carrascal, Poemas, El Insular, Castro, Chile, 29 de enero, 2014

 José María Moreno Carrascal (Introduction and translation), "Entre la celebración y lo elegíaco. Tres poetas norteamericanas de hoy: Kay Ryan, Sandra Gilbert y Joyce Carol Oates", Clarín, Revista de Nueva Literatura, September–October, 2012, nº 101, pp. 25–36, Oviedo, Spain, 2013
 José María Moreno Carrascal, «Self» y Sociedad en la Secuencia Poética «Transformations» de D. H. Lawrence, EPOS, Revista de Filología, Facultad de Filología, Universidad Nacional a Distancia,  nº xxvii,  pp. 217–224, Madrid, 2012
 José María Moreno Carrascal, “Poemas”,  Isla de Siltolá, Revista de Poesía,nº 4, Sevilla, 2011
 José María Moreno Carrascal, “Poemas”,  Isla de Siltolá, Revista de Poesía,nº 2, Sevilla, 2010
 "La LOGSE o el abandono de una pedagogía del esfuerzo" Escuela Española, June 1, 2000 and  El Mundo, Madrid, June 16, 2000.
 (John Updike), "Poemas" (Introduction and translation), Clarín, Revista de Nueva Literatura, nº 20, Oviedo, 1999.
 (Vladimir Nabokov), "Poemas "(translation by José María Moreno Carrascal and Felipe Benítez Reyes, "El Cultural", Revista de Literatura y Arte del diario El Mundo, Madrid,4. 18. 1999.
 Review of Flamenco, Passion, Politics and Popular Culture, Berg, Oxford– Washington D.C., 1996, in Demófilo, Revista de Cultura de Cultura de la Junta de Andalucía, nº 24, Seville, 1998.
 Jason Weiss, "Cuatro Poemas". Revista Atlántica de Poesía, nº 13, 1997, Cádiz.
 William Stanley Merwin, "Poemas", (Introduction and translation),Revista Atlántica de Poesía, nº 11, 1996, Cádiz.
 Clayton Eshleman, "Poemas", Revista Atlántica de Poesía, nº 10, 1995, Cádiz.
 (John Updike),"Poemas" (Introduction and translation), Revista Atlántica de Poesía, nº  9, 1995, Cádiz.
 (Clayton Eshleman), "Poemas "(Introduction and translation), Revista Atlántica de Poesía, nº 10, 1995, Cádiz.
 (William Carlos Williams), "Poemas "(Introduction and translation), Revista Atlántica de Poesía, nº 10, 1995, Cádiz.
 Wallace Stevens, "Poemas". Revista Atlántica de Poesía, nº 6, 1993, Cádiz.
 (Charles Bukowski, "Poemas" (Translation), Condados de Niebla, Revista de Literatura, Diputación Provincial de Huelva, nº 9-10, Huelva 1990.
 "Acting it out", in EDUCA, Revista de Educación de la Consejería de Educación y Ciencia de Cádiz, Cádiz, nº 19, 1989.
 (Henry Miller, "Rimbaud (I,II) (from The Times of the Assassins), (Translation), Fin de siglo, Revista de Literatura, nº 0, 1, Jerez de la Frontera, 1982. 
 (D. H. Lawrence),"Poemas" (Translation)), Cuadernos de Cera, nº 5, Rota, 1981.
 (D. H. Lawrence), "Tres Poemas" (Translation), Nueva Estafeta Literaria, nº 19, Madrid,1980.
 "Siete Poemas de D. H. Lawrence", Pandero, Revista de Literatura, nº 6, Rota, 1980.

References

1951 births
Living people
20th-century Spanish poets
Spanish male poets
21st-century Spanish poets
Aragonese writers
20th-century Spanish male writers
21st-century Spanish male writers